Bad Sassendorf is a municipality in the district of Soest, in North Rhine-Westphalia, Germany.

History
From the 8th century, the area around the Soester plain was under the Merovingian dynasty. The name “Sassendorf” indicates that it was a Saxon settlement. Mention was made of salt springs in the area appear in the 10th century, and were noted by the ambassador of the Caliphate of Cordoba to the court of Emperor Otto the Great in 973. Along with the surrounding area, the village was under the control of the Archbishopric of Cologne from at least the 12th century; however exploitation of the salt springs was the right of free peasant families in the area. 
From the 19th century, the brine produced in the area was used for bathing and medicinal purposes, and the first therapy center or spa was opened in 1852. Commercial salt production faced declining yields, and was largely discontinued in 1934, and completely discontinued by 1952. The village was renamed from “Sassendorf” to Bad Sassendorf officially in 1906.

From February 15, 1944, to April 4–5, 1945, inmates of the Neuengamme concentration camp used as the Eisenbahnbaubrigade 11 repaired rail tracks at the railway station Soest and between Bad Sassendorf and Soest. They slept in freight train waggons on the track between Bad Sassendorf and Soest. After an air raid end-February 1945 the inmates slept in a nearby farm. At the cemetery Bad Sassendorf a memorial plaque is installed on the burying place of the dead.

Geography
It is situated approximately 4 km northeast of Soest.

Neighbouring municipalities
 Anröchte
 Erwitte
 Lippetal
 Lippstadt
 Möhnesee
 Soest
 Warstein

Division of the town 
Bad Sassendorf consists of 12 districts:
 Bad Sassendorf
 Bettinghausen
 Beusingsen
 Elfsen
 Gabrechten
 Heppen
 Herringsen
 Lohne
 Neuengeseke
 Opmünden
 Ostinghausen
 Weslarn

Twin towns
  Gaming (Austria)

Notes

External links 
 Official site 

Spa towns in Germany
Soest (district)
Soest Börde